Sand Creek is a stream in El Paso County, Colorado, and a tributary of Fountain Creek.

Banning Lewis Number 1 Dam, located approximately one mile south of Shirley, was built across the East Fork of Sand Creek to create Banning Lewis Reservoir Number 1.

Sand Creek is not to be confused with Big Sandy Creek, location of the Sand Creek Massacre.

See also
List of rivers of Colorado

References

Rivers of Colorado
Rivers of El Paso County, Colorado